The Khan Market is a Delhi Metro station in Delhi, on the Violet Line. The station, near the Khan Market, was opened with the first section of the Violet Line on 3 October 2010, in time for the Commonwealth Games opening ceremony on the same day. Its preceding station is central Secretariat. It is near the Delhi Zoo and Purana Quila only by 0.8 km.

Station layout

See also
List of Delhi Metro stations
Transport in Delhi
Delhi Metro Rail Corporation
Delhi Suburban Railway

References

External links

 Delhi Metro Rail Corporation Ltd. (Official site) 
 Delhi Metro Annual Reports
 
 UrbanRail.Net – descriptions of all metro systems in the world, each with a schematic map showing all stations.

Delhi Metro stations
Railway stations opened in 2010
Railway stations in New Delhi district